Allen Larue (born 16 June 1981) is an association footballer from the Seychelles. He plays as a defender and has played for the Seychelles national football team. He plays for St Michel United FC in the Seychelles First Division, having also played for Red Star Anse-aux-Pins in the early years of his career.

Club career

Red Star Anse-aux-Pins
Allen started his career at Red Star Anse-aux-Pins and spent four years at the club, from 2003 until 2007.  Red Star Anse-aux-Pins had won the title in 2001, shortly before Allen's arrival, but have failed to win the Seychelles First Division since. In search of silverware, Larue left the club in 2007.

St Michel United FC
Larue has since moved to another club in the Seychelles, St Michel United FC. During his time at St Michel, the Seychelles' second-most successful team have won the league title three times in four years, 2008 being the only occasion during Allen's spell at the club that they have failed to win the league. Allen was also part of the St Michel squad who won the President's Cup in 2011, beating St. Louis Suns United in the final, although the defender was partly at fault for St Louis' second goal.

International career
The defender has played thirteen games for his country. One of his first games for the Seychelles came in the 2004 African Cup of Nations qualifier against Zimbabwe. Larue conceded a penalty for a foul on Benjani Mwaruwari as the Seychelles lost 3-1.

His most recent involvement with the Seychelles national football team was in July 2011, when Seychelles played a friendly against Tanzania U-23. Allen scored his first goal for the Seychelles in the resulting 3-1 loss.

References

1981 births
Living people
Seychellois footballers
Seychelles international footballers
Association football defenders
St Michel United FC players